The Charts may refer to:
The Charts (American group), 1950s
The Charts (French group), 1990s
Record chart music ranking.